Hyperectis is a genus of moths of the family Crambidae.

Species
Hyperectis apicalis Hampson, 1912
Hyperectis dioctias Meyrick, 1904

References

Pyraustinae
Taxa named by Edward Meyrick
Crambidae genera